Dave Shoji (born December 4, 1946) is an American sports coach who was the head coach of the University of Hawaii at Mānoa Rainbow Wahine Volleyball team from 1975 to 2017. Under his leadership, the Rainbow Wahine won four national titles (1979, 1982, 1983, 1987).

As of September 6, 2013 his record was 1,107–185–1, which translates to a winning percentage of 85.7%. On September 6, 2013 he became the winningest coach in Division I women's volleyball history with 1,107 wins, breaking the record formerly held by former UCLA head coach Andy Banachowski. Shoji earned the win in 4 games over Santa Clara University. His teams are known for having great ball control.

Shoji coached many standout players, including Deitre Collins, Teee Williams, Angelica Ljungqvist, Robyn Ah Mow-Santos, Kim Willoughby, Kanani Danielson and Nikki Taylor. Ah-Mow Santos succeeded Shoji as head coach of the Rainbow Wahine after his retirement on February 20, 2017.

Shoji played collegiate volleyball at the University of California, Santa Barbara, serving as the team's setter and earning All-American honors in 1968 and 1969. Shoji is also a graduate of the University of Hawaii ROTC program.

Shoji's elder son, Kawika Shoji, was a 3-year starting setter for the Stanford Cardinal men's volleyball team. During his senior year in 2010 Kawika led Stanford to the 2010 NCAA national championship and was selected as the American Volleyball Coaches Association (AVCA) player-of-the-year. Shoji's younger son, Erik Shoji, played as a libero for Stanford's volleyball team. Erik was the first player in AVCA history to earn first-team AVCA honors four years in a row.

Early life 
Shoji was born on December 4, 1946. His father, Kobe Shoji, was a veteran of the 442nd Infantry Regiment who won two Purple Hearts. When he was four, his family moved to Honolulu, Hawaii, where his father became a well-known expert in sugar cane production.

Head coaching record

Women's

Men's

Notes

See also
List of college women's volleyball coaches with 700 wins

In film
Dave Shoji's role in the first few years of women's athletics at the University of Hawaii is chronicled in the documentary film Rise of the Wahine, directed by Dean Kaneshiro. Dave was hired by UH's first female Athletic Director Dr. Donnis Thompson shortly after the passing of Title IX.

NCAA representation
On November 1, 2005, NCAA named an NCAA Division I Women's Volleyball 25th Anniversary Team. The team featured Middle Blocker Deitre Collins and Coach Dave Shoji as head coach, of seven total honorees. Tonya "Teee" Williams had also been further named to the 1980s NCAA all-Decade team for accolades.

References

External links
 Hawaii profile

1946 births
Living people
American volleyball coaches
Hawaii Rainbow Warriors volleyball coaches
Hawaii Rainbow Wahine volleyball coaches
UC Santa Barbara Gauchos baseball players
UC Santa Barbara Gauchos men's volleyball players
American sportspeople of Japanese descent